Kostas Georgakopoulos (born 14 July 1963 in Athens) is a Greek former discus thrower who competed in the 1984 Summer Olympics.

Georgakopoulos was the champion in the discus at the 1983 Mediterranean Games and returned to win a silver medal at the 1987 edition. He was the bronze medallist at the 1987 Summer Universiade.

References

1963 births
Living people
Greek male discus throwers
Olympic athletes of Greece
Athletes (track and field) at the 1984 Summer Olympics
Mediterranean Games gold medalists for Greece
Athletes (track and field) at the 1983 Mediterranean Games
Athletes from Athens
Universiade medalists in athletics (track and field)
Mediterranean Games medalists in athletics
Universiade bronze medalists for Greece
Medalists at the 1987 Summer Universiade
20th-century Greek people